The Virgin of Charity (Spanish - La Virgen de la Caridad) is a 1597-1603 painting by El Greco. It was part of a commission to paint five works for the high altarpiece of the Santuario de Nuestra Señora de la Caridad in the Spanish town of Illescas, Toledo, gained through the mediation of his son Jorge Manuel Theotocópuli. It still hangs in the Santuario. Three of the other works still hang in the church (Coronation of the Virgin, Nativity and Annunciation), whilst the fifth is in the National Museum of Art of Romania (Marriage of the Virgin).

It updates the medieval iconography of the Virgin of Mercy. The central figure of the Virgin opens her cloak, sheltering a group of figures in then-fashionable ruffs, including the painter's son and other members of the Toledan aristocracy.

Bibliography 
  ÁLVAREZ LOPERA, José, El Greco, Madrid, Arlanza, 2005, Biblioteca «Descubrir el Arte», (colección «Grandes maestros»). .
  SCHOLZ-HÄNSEL, Michael, El Greco, Colonia, Taschen, 2003. .

External links
  ArteHistoria.com. «Virgen de la Caridad» [Consulta: 04.01.2011].

1590s paintings
1600s paintings
Paintings of the Virgin Mary
Paintings by El Greco
Altarpieces